Minnesota boys high school ice hockey is made up of multiple leagues and programs representing different associations.  The two organizations associated with youth hockey are the Minnesota State High School League and Minnesota Hockey. The Minnesota State High School League is a voluntary, nonprofit association of public and private schools with a history of service to Minnesota's high school youth since 1916. Minnesota Hockey, an affiliate of USA Hockey, is the governing body of youth and amateur hockey in Minnesota. Minnesota Hockey is governed by a board of directors and consists of approximately 140 community based associations who are formed into 12 districts.

Minnesota State High School League

Minnesota Class AA and A High School Hockey
Minnesota Class AA and A High School Hockey programs are members of the Minnesota State High School League (MSHSL). The league is made up Varsity and Junior Varsity programs who are divided into two classes; AA and A.  Each class is further divided into eight sections. There are currently 148 varsity teams (70 AA and 78 A) competing for the state AA and A championships.  Minnesota high school hockey teams are not affiliated with USA Hockey and are not eligible for the Chipotle-USA Hockey National Championships.

Based on tournament attendance, hockey is the most popular high school sport in the state. Attendance has been strong throughout the years, with 38 tournaments eclipsing the 100,000+ barrier.  In 2017 Prep45.com partnered with GrandStadium.TV to stream the state tournament to viewers in 37 countries and all 50 states. The Minnesota State High School Hockey Tournament is currently the largest state sports tournament in terms of viewing and attendance, beating Florida's State High School Football Tournament and Indiana's State High School Basketball Tournament.

Minnesota Hockey

Minnesota Junior Gold High School League
Several Minnesota high schools field Junior Gold teams in addition to or as an alternative to high school Junior Varsity.  There are currently 59 Junior Gold A and B teams throughout Minnesota.  The league is governed by Minnesota Hockey and is affiliated with USA Hockey.  Minnesota Junior Gold teams are eligible for the Chipotle-USA Hockey National Championships.

National Rankings 
According to MYHockey Rankings (https://myhockeyrankings.com), Maple Grove High School is the top ranked high school hockey team in the United States.  The site ranked 1,905 high school teams for the 2021-22 season (almost every high school ice hockey team in the nation) and 19 of the top 20 high school hockey teams are from Minnesota.  MaxPreps (https://www.maxpreps.com/) also releases its high school ice hockey rankings.  However, stats for several hundred teams are either missing or incomplete and some teams are not listed leading to very inaccurate rankings.

MyHockey Rankings also ranked Shattuck-St. Mary's (MN) Prep team as the top Prep / Independent team in the United States followed by Northstar Christian Academy (MN).

Minnesota: the "State of Hockey" 
Minnesota is known as the "State of Hockey" for the talent it has produced at all levels of hockey.  The state ranks first in the nation in terms of number of players registered with USA Hockey with over 58,600.  This number does not include the roughly 6,500 high school hockey players who are not affiliated with USA Hockey. Minnesota has produced some of the best American hockey players and currently has the most active players in the National Hockey League (NHL), Division I Men's College Hockey, United States Hockey League (USHL), and the American Hockey League (AHL).

Minneapolis–Saint Paul Metropolitan Area: "Center of the American Hockey Universe" 
ESPN named the Minneapolis–Saint Paul metro area as the "Center of the American Hockey Universe" 

 There are 72 public and private high school ice hockey varsity teams  and 55 Junior Gold A and B high school ice hockey teams  within the Minneapolis–Saint Paul metro area.
 There are 36 active National Hockey League (NHL) players from the Minneapolis–Saint Paul area. 
 19 former and current National Hockey League (NHL) players from the Minneapolis–Saint Paul area have their name inscribed on the Stanley Cup. 
 Eight (8) former ice hockey players from the Minneapolis–Saint Paul area have won gold medals at the Olympic Games. Seventeen (17) have won silver medals, and one has won a bronze.  
 From 2014 to '19, the Minneapolis area saw a 4.5% increase in community participation.  This number included a 9.6% increase in girls' hockey players during that span, up to 9,227 in 2018-19 
 According to USA Hockey, there were 36,620 youth hockey players (ages 4-18) from the Minneapolis–Saint Paul metro area during the 2018-19 season. This number does not include the large number of boys and girls playing public and private high school hockey in the Twin Cities market. 
 According to USA Hockey's count, there are 163 sheets of ice in the Minneapolis area, including the largest ice arena complex in the world, the Schwan Super Rink at the National Sports Center.
 Minneapolis–Saint Paul is home to two Division I Men's and Women's ice hockey programs; the University of Minnesota and the University of St. Thomas
 Minneapolis–Saint Paul is home to the Minnesota Wild of the National Hockey League (NHL) and the Minnesota Whitecaps of the Premier Hockey Federation (PHF), formerly the National Women's Hockey League (NWHL).

 Note: These numbers do not include high school ice hockey teams or players from the Wisconsin part of the Minneapolis-St. Paul-Bloomington, MN-WI MSA.

Minnesota State High School League History 
High school hockey players throughout Minnesota participate in a maximum of 25 contests, excluding the section tournaments and the Minnesota State Boys' High School Hockey Tournament. Teams currently play three 17-minute periods to comprise a game. The lengthened periods were adopted by the Minnesota State High School League in 2003.

Boys hockey concludes their season with a four-day tournament in March that features sixteen teams competing for championships in both classes. From 1945 through 1991 the tournament consisted of a single class, eight-team tournament instead of the present-day two-class (AA and A) tournament. Private schools were not allowed to play in the Tournament until the 1974–75 season. In 1992–93, the tournament was composed of Tier I and II teams. This two-year experiment sent the top teams from each of the eight sections to the Tier I portion of the tournament and the remaining teams conducted a playoff to determine who would be included in the Tier II tournament. In 1994, the dual-class system was adopted and teams were placed into a class structure based on school enrollments.

Since 1994, the MSHSL's process to determine section assignments for boys' hockey is based on school enrollments and activity classifications. The basic premise is to place the largest 64 schools into Class AA and the remaining high schools in Class A. Both Classes are then divided into 8 sections each. Teams are placed into their section assignments with geographic location as a primary consideration. High schools initially placed in Class A have the option to play at the Class AA level.

Beginning with the 2007 state tournament, the top four teams in each class are seeded. Coaches of the participating schools vote to determine the seeded teams the Saturday before the state tournament. The four teams are then bracketed so that if the seeded teams advance, the top seed plays the fourth seed while the second and third seeds play each other. The quarterfinal opponents of the seeded teams are determined by a blind draw.

Historical timeline 

 1905 – Saint Paul Academy fields what is believed to be the oldest varsity team in the state
 1930s – High school hockey played at approximately 25 schools in Minnesota.
 1945 – First MSHSL Boys State High School Hockey Tournament held at St. Paul Auditorium.
 1949–1964 – Prep. School Hockey Tournament (for Private Schools)
 1965–1970 – Catholic School Hockey Tournament
 1969 – The tournament moves to Met Center in Bloomington, home of the Minnesota North Stars NHL team.
 1970–1974 – Independent School Hockey Tournament
 1974–Present public schools and private schools can play in the same tournament
 1976 – The tournament moves to the St. Paul Civic Center.
 1992 – Tier I and Tier II structure adopted; the Target Center in Minneapolis hosted the Tier II tournament.
 1994 – Class AA and A structure adopted.
 1999 – The tournament moved to the Target Center in Minneapolis.
 2001 – The tournament moved to the Xcel Energy Center in St. Paul, home of the new Minnesota Wild NHL team.
 2003 – Period length changed from 15 to 17 minutes.
 2007 – Coaches seed top four teams in each class.
 2008 – 19,559 fans attended the 2008 State Boys' Hockey Tournament Class AA semifinals at Xcel Energy Center, March 7, setting a new record for the largest crowd to ever attend a hockey game in the state of Minnesota.
2015 – 21,609 fans attended the 2015 State Boys' Hockey Tournament Class AA semifinals at Xcel Energy Center, March 6, setting a new record for the largest crowd to ever attend a hockey game in the state of Minnesota.
2016 – 22,244 fans attended the 2016 State Boys' Hockey Tournament Class AA semifinals at Xcel Energy Center, March 4, setting a new record for the largest crowd to ever attend a hockey game in the state of Minnesota.

Current high school varsity programs and conferences

Defunct Teams

Championship games

List of state champions

Notable alumni
List of notable alumni:

 Wendell Anderson (Saint Paul Johnson) former Governor of Minnesota (1971-6) and United States Senator (1976-8). Olympic Silver Medalist in 1956.
 Mike Antonovich (Greenway of Coleraine) former professional NHL player for the Minnesota North Stars, Hartford Whalers, and New Jersey Devils. Mayor of Coleraine, Minnesota.
 David Backes (Spring Lake Park) professional NHL player for the Saint Louis Blues and Boston Bruins. Two-time Olympian and Silver medalist in 2010.
 Bill Baker (Grand Rapids) former professional NHL player for the Montreal Canadiens, Colorado Rockies, Saint Louis Blues, and New York Rangers. Olympic Gold Medalist in 1980.
 Nick Bjugstad (Blaine) professional NHL player for the MInnesota Wild. Nephew of Scott Bjugstad.
 Scott Bjugstad (Irondale) former professional NHL player for the Minnesota North Stars, Pittsburgh Penguins, and Los Angeles Kings. One time Olympian in 1984. Uncle of Nick Bjugstad.
 Brandon Bochenski (Blaine) professional NHL and KHL player for the Ottawa Senators, Chicago Blackhawks, Boston Bruins, Anaheim Ducks, Nashville Predators, Tampa Bay Lightning, and Barys Astana. Plays internationally for Kazakhstan.
 Brian Bonin (White Bear Lake Area) former professional NHL player for the Pittsburgh Penguins and Minnesota Wild. 
 Henry Boucha (Warroad) former professional NHL player for the Detroit Red Wings, Minnesota North Stars, Kansas City Scouts, and Colorado Rockies. Olympian and Silver Medalist in 1972. Second cousin of Gary Sargent and T.J. Oshie.
 Justin Braun (White Bear Lake Area) professional NHL player for the San Jose Sharks.
 Herb Brooks (Saint Paul Johnson) former Olympic, NHL, and NCAA coach. Olympic Gold (1980) and Silver (2002) Medalist. Three-time NCAA National Champion (1974, 1976, 1979).
 Aaron Broten (Roseau) former professional NHL player for the Colorado Rockies/New Jersey Devils, Minnesota North Stars, Quebec Nordiques, Toronto Maple Leafs, and Winnipeg Jets. Brother of Neal Broten and Paul Broten.
 Neal Broten (Roseau) former professional NHL player for the Minnesota North Stars/Dallas Stars, New Jersey Devils, and Los Angeles Kings.  NCAA champion in 1979. Olympic Gold Medalist in 1980. Brother of Aaron Broten and Paul Broten.
 Paul Broten (Roseau) former professional NHL player for the  New York Rangers, Dallas Stars, and St. Louis Blues. Brother of Aaron Broten and Neal Broten.
 Warren Burger (Saint Paul Johnson) Chief Justice of the Supreme Court of the United States, 1969-1986
 Dave Christian (Warroad) former professional NHL player for the Winnipeg Jets, Washington Capitals, Boston Bruins, Saint Louis Blues, and Chicago Blackhawks. Olympic Gold Medalist in 1980. Co-founder of Christian Brothers Hockey Co. Uncle of Brock Nelson.
 Steve Christoff (Richfield) former professional NHL player for the Minnesota North Stars, Calgary Flames, and Los Angeles Kings. Olympic Gold Medalist in 1980.
 Mike Crowley (Bloomington Jefferson) former professional NHL player for the Mighty Ducks of Anaheim.
 Matt Cullen (Moorhead) professional NHL player for the Mighty Ducks of Anaheim, Florida Panthers, Carolina Hurricanes, New York Rangers, Ottawa Senators, Nashville Predators, and Pittsburgh Penguins. Three-time Stanley Cup Champion (2006, 2016, 2017).
 Mark Dayton (The Blake School) United States Senator (2001-2007) and Governor of Minnesota (2011–2019).
 François-Henri Désérable (Wayzata) French author.
 Jake Gardiner (Minnetonka) professional NHL player for the Toronto Maple Leafs. 
 Phil Housley (South Saint Paul) former professional NHL player for the Buffalo Sabres, Winnipeg Jets, St. Louis Blues, Calgary Flames, New Jersey Devils, Washington Capitals, Chicago Blackhawks, and Toronto Maple Leafs. Current coach of the Buffalo Sabres. 
 Matt Hendricks (Blaine) professional NHL player for the Winnipeg Jets, Colorado Avalanche, Washington Capitals, Nashville Predators and the Edmonton Oilers. 
 Steve Janaszak (Hill-Murray) former professional NHL player for the  Minnesota North Stars and Colorado Rockies. Olympic Gold Medalist in 1980.
 Jim Johannson (Mayo High School), American ice hockey player, coach and USA Hockey executive
 Jamie Langenbrunner (Cloquet)  former professional NHL player for the Dallas Stars, New Jersey Devils, and St. Louis Blues. Two-time Stanley Cup champion in 1999 and 2003.
 Reed Larson (Minneapolis Roosevelt) 
 Nick Leddy (Eden Prairie)
 Anders Lee (Saint Thomas, Edina)
 Brian Lee (Moorhead)
Chris Locker (Duluth East) 
 Paul Martin (Elk River Area)
 John Mayasich (Eveleth)
 Rob McClanahan (Mounds View)
 Ryan McDonagh (Cretin-Derham)
 Brock Nelson (Warroad)
 Craig Norwich (Edina)
 T. J. Oshie (Warroad)
 Mark Parrish (Bloomington Jefferson)
George Pelawa (Bemidji)
Matt Peterson (Maple Grove)
 Mike Ramsey (Minneapolis Roosevelt)
 Tim Pawlenty (South Saint Paul) Governor of Minnesota (2003-2011) and 2012 candidate for President.
 Dean Phillips (The Blake School) U.S. Representative (2019-)
 John Pohl (Red Wing)
 Tom Preissing (Rosemount)
 Gary Sargent (Bemidji) former professional NHL player for the Los Angeles Kings and Minnesota North Stars. Second cousin of Henry Boucha and first cousin of T. J. Oshie.
Dave Spehar (Duluth East)
 Pete Stauber (Duluth Denfeld) U.S. Representative (2019-)
 Alex Stalock (South Saint Paul)
 Terry Steinbach (New Ulm) former professional MLB player. Three-time MLB All-Star and once World Series champion in 1989.
David Tomassoni (Chisholm) former professional hockey player for Italian Men's National Team; Minnesota Senator and President of the Minnesota Senate (2020-1)
 Chris Weinke (Cretin-Derham Hall) former professional football and baseball player. Heisman Trophy winner in 2000.
 Blake Wheeler (Breck)
 Doug Woog (South Saint Paul)
 Doug Zmolek (Rochester Marshall)

References

Further reading

John Rosengren's book Blades of Glory: The True Story of a Young Team Bred to Win (2003, Sourcebooks, Inc.) follows the 2000-2001 Bloomington-Jefferson Jaguars' season.

External links
 FollowThePuck.com – Minnesota High School Hockey
 MNHockeyHub.com – Minnesota Boys High School Hockey
 MSHSL.org - Minnesota State High School League
 MinnesotaHockey.org - Minnesota Hockey
 JGHSL.org - Junior Gold High School League

Minnesota
Minnesota State High School League
Ice hockey in Minnesota
High school sports in Minnesota